Raj Kapoor (pronunciation: [ɾaːd͡ʒ kəpuːɾ], born Ranbir Raj Kapoor; also known as Ranbir Raj Kapoor; 14 December 1924  2 June 1988) was an Indian actor, film director and producer, who worked in Hindi cinema. He is considered one of the greatest and most influential Bollywood actors and filmmakers, and has been referred to as The Greatest Showman of Indian Cinema and as the Charlie Chaplin of Indian Cinema.

Born in Peshawar as the son of Prithviraj Kapoor of the Kapoor family, Raj Kapoor starred in and produced many films for which he received multiple accolades, including three National Film Awards and 11 Filmfare Awards in India. He was inspired by Charlie Chaplin and played characters based on The Tramp in films such as Awaara (1951, also as producer) and Shree 420 (1955). His performance in Awaara was ranked as one of the "Top-Ten Greatest Performances of All Time in World Cinema" by Time magazine in 2005; both that and his other produced film Boot Polish (1954) competed for the Palme d'Or grand prize at the Cannes Film Festival.

His movies were global commercial successes in parts of Asia, the Middle East, Africa and the Soviet bloc. The Government of India honoured him with the Padma Bhushan in 1971 for his contributions to the arts. India's highest award in cinema, the Dadasaheb Phalke Award, was bestowed on him in 1987 by the Government of India.

Early life and background

Raj Kapoor was born as Shrishti Nath Kapoor on 14 December 1924 at Kapoor Haveli, a large house then owned by his grandfather in the Qissa Khwani Bazaar neighborhood of Peshawar, British India into a Punjabi Hindu family of the Kapoor clan, who belonged to the Dhai Ghar Khatri community. His parents were Prithviraj Kapoor and Ramsarni Devi Kapoor (née Mehra). The Kapoor family hailed originally from Samundri, Samundri Tehsil, Lyallpur District, Punjab Province, British India. He was the eldest sibling of six children in the family. He was the grandson of Dewan Basheshwarnath Kapoor, great-grandson of Dewan Keshavmal Kapoor, and great-great-grandson of Dewan Murli Mal Kapoor, and was part of the famous Kapoor family. His brothers were the late actors Shammi Kapoor and Shashi Kapoor. He also had a sister named Urmila Sial. Two other siblings died in infancy. Kapoor's family later on moved from Peshawar, North-West Frontier Province to Bombay, Bombay Presidency for residence and for education.
He is the nephew of actor Trilok Kapoor, who is the younger brother of his father Prithviraj Kapoor. His first cousin was actor Subbiraj who was his father's sister's son.
His father's cousin was film producer Surinder Kapoor, whose children are producer Boney Kapoor and actors Anil Kapoor and Sanjay Kapoor. His father's maternal first cousins were actors Kamal Kapoor, Ravindra Kapoor, and Nandkishore Kapoor. Kamal Kapoor's grandson is filmmaker Goldie Behl. His maternal first cousin, Juggal Kishore Mehra, was a singer, whose step-granddaughter, Salma Agha, later became an actress and singer.

As Prithviraj moved from city to city early in his career during the 1930s, the family had to move too. Raj Kapoor attended several different schools like Colonel Brown Cambridge School in Dera Doon, St Xavier's Collegiate School in Calcutta and Campion School in Bombay.

Career
At the age of ten, he appeared in a Hindi film for the first time, in 1935's Inquilab. Raj Kapoor's big break came with the lead role in Neel Kamal (1947) opposite Madhubala in her first role as a leading lady. In 1948, at the age of twenty-four, he established his own studio, R. K. Films, and became the youngest film director of his time making his directorial debut with Aag starring himself, Nargis, Kamini Kaushal and Premnath. In 1949 he co-starred alongside Dilip Kumar and Nargis in Mehboob Khan's hit film Andaz which was his first major success as an actor. He had his first success as producer, director and star of Barsaat released later that year.

He went on to produce and star in several hit films made under his R. K. Banner including  Awaara (1951), Aah (1953), Shree 420 (1955), Jagte Raho (1956) and Jis Desh Men Ganga Behti Hai (1960), the last was directed by Radhu Karmakar, his longtime cinematographer, and which won Filmfare Award for Best Film. These films established his screen image modeled on Charlie Chaplin's most famous screen persona of The Tramp. Outside of his home productions, his other notable films as a leading actor included Dastan (1950), Anhonee (1952), Chori Chori (1956), Anari (1959), Do Ustad (1959), Chhalia (1960) and Dil Hi To Hai (1963). He also produced the hit social films Boot Polish (1954) and Ab Dilli Door Nahin (1957).

In 1964, he produced, directed and starred in the romantic musical Sangam alongside Rajendra Kumar and Vyjayantimala which was his first film in colour. This was his last major success as a leading actor as his later films like Dulha Dulhan (1964), Around the World (1966) and Sapnon Ka Saudagar (1968) with younger starlets Sadhana, Rajshree and Hema Malini were box office flops. In 1965 he was a member of the jury at the 4th Moscow International Film Festival.

In 1970 he produced, directed and starred in his ambitious film Mera Naam Joker which took more than six years to complete. His son Rishi Kapoor made his debut in this film playing the younger version of his character. When released in 1970, it was a box office disaster and put Kapoor and his family into a financial crisis. In later years it was acknowledged as a cult classic. In 1971, he launched his eldest son Randhir Kapoor in the family drama Kal Aaj Aur Kal starring himself, his son Randhir, his father Prithviraj Kapoor as well as Randhir's to-be wife Babita. He launched his second son Rishi Kapoor's career in 1973 when he produced and directed Bobby which was a huge box office success and introduced actress Dimple Kapadia, later a very popular actress; it was the first of a new generation of teen romances. Dimple wore bikinis which was quite unique for Indian films then. In 1975 he acted alongside his son Randhir again in Dharam Karam, which Randhir also directed.

In the latter half of the 1970s and early 1980s he produced and directed films that focused on the female protagonists: Satyam Shivam Sundaram (1978) with Zeenat Aman, Prem Rog (1982) with Padmini Kolhapure and Ram Teri Ganga Maili (1985) which introduced Mandakini. He acted in fewer films by the late 1970s and early 1980s but played a notable supporting role alongside Rajesh Khanna in Naukri (1978) and as the titular character alongside Sanjay Khan in Abdullah (1980). He played a detective in two comedy films: Do Jasoos (1975) and Gopichand Jasoos (1982), both directed by Naresh Kumar (brother of Rajendra Kumar). In 1979 he was a member of the jury at the 11th Moscow International Film Festival. Raj Kapoor's last major film appearance was in Vakil Babu (1982) where he appeared with his younger brother Shashi. A film he had shot and completed in 1982 titled Chor Mandali in which he appeared opposite fellow veteran actor Ashok Kumar remained unreleased due to a legal dispute. His last acting role was a cameo appearance in a 1984 released British made-for-television film titled Kim.

He was set to direct Henna starring his son Rishi and Pakistani actress Zeba Bakhtiar before his death in 1988. His son Randhir directed the film and it released in 1991.

Personal life
On 12 May 1946, Raj Kapoor married Krishna Malhotra (1931–2018), who was his father's first cousin (commonly known as his first cousin once removed). Her father was a brother of Raj Kapoor's paternal grandmother, and she was thus a first cousin of Raj Kapoor's father Prithviraj Kapoor. It was a match arranged by their families in the usual Indian way, and it lasted all their lives. The news of Raj Kapoor's marriage was reported in the cine-magazine Filmindia June 1946 issue as, "Raj Kapoor, the talented and versatile son of Prithviraj Kapoor ended his career of wild oats by marrying Miss Krishna Malhotra in the second week of May at Rewa, Madhya Pradesh".Raj Kapoor's Wife Krishna Raj Kapoor Dies Of A Cardiac Arrest At 87. Ndtv.com. Retrieved on 20 November 2018. Krishna was one of nine siblings, and following her marriage, many of them joined the Hindi film industry. Her brothers, Rajendra Nath, Prem Nath and Narendra Nath, later became actors, and her sister Uma is married to actor Prem Chopra.

Raj and Krishna Kapoor had five children: three sons, actors Randhir Kapoor (1947–), Rishi Kapoor (1952–2020) and Rajiv Kapoor (1962–2021), and two daughters, Ritu Nanda (1949–2020) and Rima Jain (1955–). Randhir is married to former actress Babita and is the father of actresses Karishma Kapoor and Kareena Kapoor. Rishi was married to former actress Neetu Singh until his death and is father of two children, a daughter Riddhima, and a son, actor Ranbir Kapoor. Raj Kapoor's elder daughter, Ritu Nanda, was married until their deaths to industrialist Rajan Nanda (scion of the family which promoted and controls the Escorts group), and she was the mother of two children. Her son, Nikhil Nanda, is married to Shweta, daughter of actors Amitabh Bachchan and Jaya Bachchan. Raj Kapoor's younger daughter, Rima Jain, is married to investment banker Manoj Jain and is the mother of aspiring actors Armaan Jain and Aadar Jain.

Both of Kapoor's brothers, all three of Kapoor's sons, two of Kapoor's daughters-in-law and three of Kapoor's grandchildren have been active at various times in the film industry. His granddaughters Karisma Kapoor and Kareena Kapoor (daughters of Kapoor's eldest son Randhir), and grandson Ranbir Kapoor (son of Kapoor's second son Rishi) are the latest Bollywood stars from the Kapoor family, while another of his grandsons, Nikhil Nanda (Kapoor's daughter Ritu's son), is a noted industrialist.

Kapoor had a longtime romantic relationship with renowned actress Nargis Dutt during the 1940s and 1950s, despite being a married man, although neither ever publicly admitted to this. The couple starred in several films together, including Awaara and Shree 420. As Raj would not leave his wife and children, Nargis ended their relationship after Chori Chori and married Sunil Dutt with whom she fell in love on the set of Mother India (1957). Kapoor is also said to have had an affair with top 1960s actress Vyjayantimala during the shooting of Sangam. Vyjayanthimala has denied that she was ever involved with Kapoor. She deemed the whole thing a publicity stunt by Kapoor to promote his film. Kapoor has also been linked with the southern actress Padmini. In 2017, his second son Rishi confirmed his father's affairs in his autobiography Khullam Khulla.

In January 2020, Kapoor's eldest daughter Ritu died. His second son Rishi died in April the same year. His youngest son Rajiv died in February 2021.

Dilip Kumar, Mukesh, Dev Anand, Pran, Rajendra Kumar, Manna Dey, Shankar Jaikishan, Hrishikesh Mukherjee, Khwaja Ahmad Abbas and Rajesh Khanna were among Kapoor's closest friends from the movie industry.

 Filmography 

 Directed features 

1. Aag (1948)

2. Barsaat (1949)

3. Awaara (1951)

4. Shree 420 (1955)

5. Sangam (1964)

6. Mera Naam Joker (1970)

7. Bobby (1973)

8. Satyam Shivam Sundaram (1978)

9. Prem Rog (1982)

10. Ram Teri Ganga Maili (1985)

Death

Cause

Raj Kapoor suffered from asthma in his later years; he died of complications related to the disease in 1988 at the age of 63. He collapsed at the event where he was to receive the Dadasaheb Phalke Award in New Delhi, and was taken to the All India Institute of Medical Sciences, New Delhi for treatment. He was hospitalised for about a month before he succumbed to complications arising from his asthma. At the time of his death, he was working on the movie Henna (an Indo-Pakistan based love story). The film was later completed by his sons Randhir Kapoor and Rishi Kapoor and was released in 1991.

 Memorial at family farm in Pune 

His and his parents' Samadhi (memorial) is at their family farm "Rajbaugh", which means the "gardens of king". Located inside the MIT Art Design and Technology University (MIT ADTU), Rajbaugh lies on the banks of Mula-Mutha River in Loni Kalbhor village 30 km east of Pune in Maharashtra. Kapoor family sold part of 125 acres Rajbaugh to MIT ADTU which built a memorial for the Kapoor family on its campus. Memorial was unveiled in 2014 in the presence of Lata Mangeshkar and Kapoor clan. Kapoor family memorial has 7 pagodas showing elements of Raj Kapoor's movies, a museum or viewing gallery which showcases family photographs and moments from his movie making from 1945 to 1990. Raj Kapoor shot many of his films at this farm, including Satyam Shivam Sundaram, Mera Naam Joker, Bobby, and Prem Rog. The family Banglow inside the farm has been preserved; the popular song "Hum Tum Ek Kamre Mein Band Ho" was shot inside this banglow.With RK Studios up for sale in Mumbai, here is how Pune still hangs on to Raj Kapoor's memories, Hindustan Times, 2 September 2018.Madhu Jain, 2009, Kapoors: The First Family of Indian Cinema, Penguin Books.

Legacy
Raj Kapoor is often referred as The Greatest Showman of Indian Cinema in the Indian media. Film historians and movie buffs speak of him as the "Charlie Chaplin of Indian cinema", since he often portrayed a tramp-like figure, who, despite adversity, was still cheerful and honest. His movies were popular in large parts of South/Central/Southeast Asia, the former Soviet Union/Bloc, China, the Middle East, and Africa; his movies were global commercial successes.

Siddharth Kak made, Raj Kapoor, a feature film documentary on the actor in 1987 which was produced by the Government of India's Films Division.

A postage stamp, bearing his face, was released by India Post to honour him on 14 December 2001. To honour him, a brass statue of his was unveiled at Walk of the Stars at Bandra Bandstand in Mumbai in March 2012.

Many of Raj Kapoor's movies had a patriotic theme. His films Aag, Shree 420 and Jis Desh Men Ganga Behti Hai (In the country where the Ganges flows) celebrated the newly independent India, and encouraged film-goers to be patriots. Raj Kapoor commissioned these famous lyrics for Mera Joota Hai Japani, a song from the movie Shree 420:

 Mera joota hai Japani (My shoes are Japanese)
 Ye patloon Inglistani (These trousers are English)
 Sar pe lal topi Roosi (The red cap on my head is Russian)
 Phir bhi dil hai Hindustani (But still, however, my heart is Indian)
The song is still extremely popular and has been featured in a number of movies since Shree 420 was released. Indian author Mahasweta Devi stopped the show with her inaugural speech at the 2006 Frankfurt Book Fair when she used these lyrics to express her own heartfelt patriotism and debt to her country.

In 2014, Google commemorated his 90th birthday.

Raj Kapoor was a canny judge of filmi music and lyrics. Many of the songs he commissioned are evergreen hits. He introduced the music directors Shankar–Jaikishan and the lyricists Hasrat Jaipuri and Shailendra. He is also remembered for his strong sense of visual style. He used striking visual compositions, elaborate sets, and dramatic lighting to complete the mood set by the music. He introduced the actresses Nimmi, Dimple Kapadia, and Mandakini, as well as launching and reviving the careers of his sons Rishi, Randhir and Rajiv. Famous for making his actresses reveal the body, not very common then in Indian cinema, it was said his 'show-womanship' matched his showmanship.

Raj Kapoor's Shree 420 (1955) movie's Hindi song Mera Joota Hai Japani ("My Shoes are Japanese") was used in opening sequence of 20th Century Studios 2016 movie Deadpool, starring Ryan Reynolds.

The 1967 "Song about Yogis" by Vladimir Vysotsky mentions Raj Kapoor as one of the three best-known symbols of Indian culture in the Soviet Union, along with Shiva and yoga.

He was called "the Clark Gable of the Indian film industry".

 Awards and honors 

Kapoor had received many awards throughout his career, including 3 National Film Awards, 11 Filmfare Awards and 21 nominations. His films Awaara (1951) and Boot Polish (1954) were nominated for the Palme d'Or at the Cannes Film Festival. His acting in the former was rated as one of the "Top Ten Performances of All Time in World Cinema" by Time magazine. His film Jagte Raho (1956) also won the Crystal Globe award at the Karlovy Vary International Film Festival.

The Government of India honoured him with the Padma Bhushan in 1971 and the Dadasaheb Phalke Award in 1987 – the highest award for cinematic excellence in India. In 2001, he was honoured with "Best Director of the Millennium" by Stardust Awards. He was named "Showman of the Millennium" by Star Screen Awards in 2002.

In June 2011, Noah Cowan, artistic director of TIFF Bell Lightbox, and Sabbas Joseph, Director, Wizcraft along with members of the Kapoor family came together to pay tribute to the life and work of Indian actor, director, mogul and legend Raj Kapoor, as presented in partnership by TIFF (Toronto International Film Festival), the International Indian Film Academy (IIFA), and the Government of Ontario. In 2011, it was announced that Kapoor will be inducted into the Brampton Walk of Fame in Ontario, Canada.

Association with other artists

Khwaja Ahmad Abbas
Khwaja Ahmad Abbas was a screenwriter and director for a number of Raj Kapoor's best films.
 Awaara (1951)
 Anhonee (1952)
 Shree 420 (1955)
 Jagte Raho (1956)
 Char Dil Char Rahen (1959)
 Mera Naam Joker (1970)
 Bobby (1973)
 Henna (1991)

Shankar–Jaikishan
Shankar–Jaikishan were Raj Kapoor's music directors of choice. He worked with them in 20 films in all including 10 of his own films from Barsaat until Kal Aaj Aur Kal.  (Jagte Raho with Salil Chowdhury and Ab Dilli Dur Nahin being two exceptions in this period). Only after Jaikishan died, did he turn to a different music director – Laxmikant–Pyarelal for Bobby, Satyam Shivam Sundaram and Prem Rog (later on, his children used Laxmikant-Pyarelal for Prem Granth as well), Rahul Dev Burman for Dharam Karam, and Ravindra Jain for (Ram Teri Ganga Maili and Henna). Raj Kapoor acted in a movie with music by Madan Mohan only once (twice), i.e. Dhoon (1953) & Ashiana (1952), which featured duet Hum Pyaar Karenge by Hemant Kumar and Lata Mangeshkar, the only instance of Hemant Kumar giving playback to Raj Kapoor, and did only one movie with O. P. Nayyar (Do Ustad).

List of films with Shankar–Jaikishan: (18 Films)

 Barsaat (1949)
 Aah (1953)
 Awaara (1951)
 Boot Polish (1954)
 Shree 420 (1955)
 Chori Chori (1956)
 Kanhaiya (1959)
 Main Nashe Men Hoon (1959)
 Jis Desh Men Ganga Behti Hai (1960)
 Aashiq (1962)
 Ek Dil Sao Afsane (1963)
 Sangam (1964)
 Teesri Kasam (1966)
 Around the World (1967)
 Diwana (1967)
 Sapnon Ka Saudagar (1968)
 Mera Naam Joker (1970)
 Kal Aaj Aur Kal (1971)

Nargis
Raj Kapoor and Nargis worked together in 16 films including 6 of his own productions.

 Aag (1948)
 Andaz (1949)
 Barsaat (1949)
 Pyaar (1950)
 Jan Pahechan (1950)
 Awaara (1951)
 Amber (1952)
 Anhonee (1952)
 Ashiana (1952)
 Bewafa (1952)
 Aah (1953)
 Paapi (1953)
 Dhoon (1953)
 Shree 420 (1955)
 Chori Chori (1956)
 Jagte Raho (1956) (cameo)

Mukesh and Manna Dey
Mukesh was Raj Kapoor's almost exclusive singing voice in almost all of his films. Also, when Mukesh died, Raj had said, Main ne apni aawaaz ko kho diya... (I have lost my voice...). However Manna Dey has also sung many notable and super-hit songs for Raj Kapoor, for instance in Shree 420 and Chori Chori. Examples of such Manna songs are best illustrated by the following list:
 "Laga Chunri Mein Daag" (Dil Hi To Hai)
 "Ae Bhai Zara Dekh Ke Chalo" (Mera Naam Joker)
 "Dil Ka Haal Sune Dil Wala" (Shree 420)
 "Aaja Sanam Madhur Chandni Mein Hum" (Chori Chori)
 "Jahan Mein Jati Hoon Wahin Chale Aate Ho" (Chori Chori)
 "Yeh Raat Bhigi Bhigi, Yeh Mast Fizayen" (Chori Chori)
 "Masti Bhara Hai Samaan" (Parvarish)
 "Mud Mud Ke Na Dekh" (Shree 420)
 "Pyar hua Iqrar hua hai" (Shree 420)
 "Chalat Musafir" (Teesri Kasam)
 "Belia Belia Belia" (Parvarish)
 "Lallah Allah Tera Nigehbaan" (Abdullah)
 "Mama O Mama" (Parvarish)

References

Bibliography

 
 
 Rajadhyaksha, Ashish; Willemen, Paul (1994). Encyclopedia of Indian Cinema''. London: British Film Institute; New Delhi: Oxford University Press. .

External links

 

 
Punjabi people
Indian Hindus
Punjabi Hindus
1924 births
1988 deaths
Indian male film actors
20th-century Indian film directors
Hindi-language film directors
Dadasaheb Phalke Award recipients
Male actors in Hindi cinema
Film producers from Mumbai
Film directors from Mumbai
20th-century Indian male actors
Recipients of the Padma Bhushan in arts
Raj
Male actors from Mumbai
Hindkowan people
Filmfare Awards winners
Deaths from asthma